Chief of Staff of the Army (CoSA) has been the title of the second in command of the Sri Lanka Army. The post is held by a regular officer of the rank of major general and is the second senior position in the army. Chief of staff is charged with assisting the Army Commander in both operational and administrative aspects, functioning as the Acting Army Commander in his absences or incantation. Chief of staff is assisted by the Deputy Chief of Staff of the Army.

History
The post was established in 1949, when Lieutenant Colonel Anton Muttukumaru was appointed as Chief of Staff to Brigadier the Earl of Caithness, the first Army Commander when the Ceylon Army was formed. The post was thereafter held by one of the senior most officers in the Ceylon Army, usually of the rank of colonel. In 1955, Colonel Gerard Wijeyekoon held the post and served as Acting Army Commander, while Brigadier Muttukumaru  attend Imperial Defence College. On his return in 1956 Brigadier Muttukumaru assumed command of the army and Colonel Wijeyekoon was transferred to the newly created post of Commandant of the Volunteer Force which became the second most senior post in the army. Since 1966, it became the third-ranking after that of Army Commander. In the 1970s the post became a Brigadier's posting In the early 1990s the post of Deputy Chief of Staff was created. The post of  chief of staff has become a major general's posting since the early 1980s.

List of Chiefs of Staff

References

External links
  Sri Lanka Army

1949 establishments in Ceylon
Sri Lanka Army appointments
Lists of Sri Lankan military personnel